Darling Dear may refer to:

 "Darling Dear", single by The Counts
 Darling Dear (The Miracles song), the B-side to "Point It Out"
 Darling Dear (EP), an EP by Little Fish

See also
Dear Darling (disambiguation)